Caio Cesar Cardoso Zampieri (born May 27, 1986 in Mogi Guaçu, Brazil) is a Brazilian professional tennis player.

Challenger finals

Singles: 0 (0–1)

Futures titles

Titles Singles: (8)

References

External links
 
 
 
 

1986 births
Living people
Sportspeople from São Paulo (state)
Brazilian people of Italian descent
Brazilian male tennis players
People from Mogi Guaçu